Eleele (literally, "black" or "black water" in Hawaiian) is a census-designated place (CDP) on the island of Kauai in Kauai County, Hawaii, United States, with the ZIP code of 96705. Glass Beach, that is made of sea glass, is a local attraction. The population was 2,515 at the 2020 census, up from 2,040 at the 2000 census.

Geography
Eleele is located on the south side of the island of Kauai at  (21.910489, -159.584330). It is bordered to the west by Hanapepe, with the Hanapēpē River forming the boundary between the two communities. Hawaii Route 50 passes through Eleele, leading east  to Kalaheo and west  to Kaumakani.

The water area consists of the east side of Hanapepe Bay.

Demographics

As of the census of 2000, there were 2,040 people, 626 households, and 500 families residing in the CDP. The population density was 2,463.5 people per square mile (949.0/km2). There were 652 housing units at an average density of 787.4 per square mile (303.3/km2). The racial makeup of the CDP was 9.5% White, 0.3% African American, 0.1% Native American, 61.8% Asian, 5.3% Pacific Islander, 0.7% from other races, and 22.5% from two or more races. Hispanic or Latino of any race were 8.2% of the population.

There were 626 households, out of which 41.2% had children under the age of 18 living with them, 58.6% were married couples living together, 16.1% had a female householder with no husband present, and 20.1% were non-families. 18.1% of all households were made up of individuals, and 8.6% had someone living alone who was 65 years of age or older. The average household size was 3.26 and the average family size was 3.66.

In the CDP the population was spread out, with 30.0% under the age of 18, 6.6% from 18 to 24, 27.4% from 25 to 44, 19.9% from 45 to 64, and 16.2% who were 65 years of age or older. The median age was 36 years. For every 100 females, there were 95.6 males.  For every 100 females age 18 and over, there were 94.4 males.

The median income for a household in the CDP was $46,705, and the median income for a family was $53,047. Males had a median income of $35,500 versus $25,667 for females. The per capita income for the CDP was $15,873.  About 9.2% of families and 13.2% of the population were below the poverty line, including 15.9% of those under age 18 and 10.6% of those age 65 or over.

Climate
In essence, a tropical savanna climate tends to either see less rainfall than a tropical monsoon climate or have more pronounced dry seasons than a tropical monsoon climate. The Köppen Climate Classification subtype for this climate is "As". (Tropical Savanna Climate).

References

Census-designated places in Kauai County, Hawaii
Populated places on Kauai
Populated coastal places in Hawaii